Al-Hamza Sport Club, is an Iraqi football team based in Al-Hamza Al-Sharqi, Al-Qādisiyyah, that plays in Iraq Division Two.

Managerial history
 Zaman Ghanim
 Hashim Ariouch

See also 
 2001–02 Iraq FA Cup
 2002–03 Iraq FA Cup
 2019–20 Iraq FA Cup

References

External links
 Iraq FA Cup SC on Goalzz.com
 Iraq Clubs- Foundation Dates

1968 establishments in Iraq
Association football clubs established in 1968
Football clubs in Al-Qādisiyyah